"How Deep Is Your Love" is an R&B single by group Dru Hill. It is the first single from the group's second album, Enter the Dru. The song was released on September 22, 1998. It spent three weeks at number-one on the US R&B chart, and peaked at number three on the US Billboard Hot 100 chart. The song, in its single version with rapper Redman, was also used in the end credits and is featured on the soundtrack to the 1998 film Rush Hour. To date, this is Dru Hill's highest charting hit.

Music video
The music video was directed by Brett Ratner and was shot on top of Hopewell Centre in Wan Chai, Hong Kong and features clips from Rush Hour. Redman's verse is cut from both the group's album and the video version as he does not appear in the video.

Track listing

US 12" single
Side A
"How Deep Is Your Love" – 4:03
"How Deep Is Your Love" (featuring Redman) – 3:58
"How Deep Is Your Love" (Instrumental) – 4:05
Side B
"Beauty"/"What Do I Do with the Love"/"You Are Everything" (snippets) – 3:35
"How Deep Is Your Love" (a cappella) (featuring Redman) – 3:58

Charts and certifications

Weekly charts

Year-end charts

Certifications

See also
List of number-one R&B singles of 1998 (U.S.)

References

1998 singles
1998 songs
Dru Hill songs
Redman (rapper) songs
Island Records singles
Song recordings produced by Warryn Campbell
Songs written by Warryn Campbell
Music videos directed by Brett Ratner
Songs written by Redman (rapper)
Songs written by Sisqó